The Choice is an American television dating game show that premiered on Fox on June 7, 2012, immediately following the premiere of Take Me Out.

Format
The format of the program, which utilizes a format similar to the blind audition rounds of The Voice, features three stages of competition and involves four single celebrity contestants (usually male; the opposite, featuring four female celebrities, also occasionally occurs), competing to fill teams of three possible dates. The first is the blind audition, in which four contestants listen to potential dates give their first impression while the celebrities' chairs are turned around as to not see them. Each celebrity contestant has the length of the possible suitor's time (about thirty seconds) to decide if he or she is interested in going out with that person. Each celebrity contestant must select three people to choose to be on their team (celebrities who have already selected their three potential dates still have to wait until after the contestant has finished giving their first impression to see them). The contestants turn their chairs to signify that they are interested in going out with that person; if two or more of the celebrity contestants want the same person (as happens frequently), the prospective date has the final choice of which celebrity they would be most interested in going out with.

The second phase of the competition is the speed dating round, in which the celebrities find out more about their three potential dates. The male and female contestants are rotated to meet each other and have usually around fifteen seconds to ask questions about the other person. At the end of each interval, the individual celebrity contestant's chair is turned around to signal the next two participants to start their interview. At the end of the round, each celebrity must eliminate one contestant.

The third and final round involves the two remaining contestants (who are brought out one at a time) being asked a single question, in which they give their opinion about a particular topic relating to their interests, families or personal lives. After both contestants have given their answer, the celebrity contestant's chair is turned to allow them to make the decision about who they are most interested in dating, each celebrity then must come onstage to reveal to the host, audience and the remaining contestants, which of the two they have chosen to go out on a date with.

Episodes

References

External links
Official Website (via Internet Archive)

2010s American reality television series
2012 American television series debuts
2012 American television series endings
American dating and relationship reality television series
2010s American game shows
English-language television shows
Fox Broadcasting Company original programming
Television game shows with incorrect disambiguation